Joséphine Jacques-André-Coquin (born 21 September 1990) is a French right-handed épée fencer, 2022 team European champion, and 2016 Olympian.

Medal Record

European Championship

Grand Prix

World Cup

References 

1990 births
Living people
French female épée fencers
Fencers at the 2016 Summer Olympics
Olympic fencers of France
Mediterranean Games silver medalists for France
Mediterranean Games medalists in fencing
Competitors at the 2018 Mediterranean Games
20th-century French women
21st-century French women